Memphis International Raceway (formerly known as Memphis Motorsports Park) was an auto racing park located near the Loosahatchie River in Shelby County, Tennessee, United States, just approximately ten miles south of Millington, and a few miles north of the city of Memphis.

History
The Memphis International Raceway (more commonly known as MIR) was founded in 1986 by Ed Gatlin, who along with a group of investors, bought a 400-acre tract of land within the northeastern section of Shelby County, and built a drag strip with an adjacent road course, including a dirt track and a go-kart track.
The facility opened in 1987 with a drag strip and 1.8-mile (2.9 km) road course.  It includes a 3/4-mile tri-oval short track, built in 1998, which once hosted the NASCAR Xfinity Series and Camping World Truck Series, as well as an ASA Late Model Series race.  The  drag strip hosts events such as International Hot Rod Association (IHRA) World Finals and Nitro Jam, Professional Drag Racers Association (PDRA), HOT ROD Power Tour, Super Chevy Show, Fun Ford Series and Mega Mopar Action Series.

The entire facility was purchased by the Grand Prix Association of Long Beach in 1996, and in 1997, a ¾-mile paved tri-oval was added on the site of the old dirt track, while a new dirt track was built on the site of the former go-kart track. The name of the facility was also changed to Memphis Motorsports Park and the tri-oval opened on June 5, 1998.

The following month, Memphis Motorsports Park was acquired by Dover Motorsports, Inc. in connection with its purchase of the Grand Prix Association of Long Beach. Memphis Motorsports Park closed October 30, 2009 due to lack of finances.  Its parent company, Dover Motorsports, Inc. announced that it was ceasing all operations at Memphis Motorsports Park and that it would not be promoting any events in Memphis in 2010.  The Memphis facility was under an agreement of sale to Gulf Coast Entertainment but Gulf Coast was unable to secure financing. The track's Camping World Truck Series date was moved to Nashville Superspeedway and its Nationwide Series date to Gateway International Raceway, and later abandoned after a year. Dover Motorsports, Inc. auctioned off the complex on December 14, 2010 to Palm Beach International Raceway for $1.9 million.

It was announced on January 31, 2011 that the deal between Palm Beach International and Dover Motorsports was finalized, and the track re-opened in April 2011. The track was also renamed to Memphis International Raceway, and a new logo was created to reflected the change which adopted a similar theme with its sister track in Palm Beach.  The track became sanctioned with IHRA, which has held the IHRA Nitro Jam finale at Memphis since 2011.

2013

In 2013, MIR gained more events for the park, including the 2nd annual Ford Fun Weekend at Memphis (was hosted at MIR in 2012 as well), and the Mega Mopar Action Series. This was the first year where the three major domestic manufacturers (Chevy, Ford, and Dodge) held an event at Memphis in the same year under the new owners. The track also drew attention to the Mid South Region of NASA, which uses the road course for track events featuring High Performance Driving Events (HPDEs), Time Trial, Wheel to Wheel Racing, and NASA-X autocross events. Retired NASCAR driver, Rusty Wallace opened up his driving experience and go kart facility on the NASCAR Oval in May 2013. MIR also picked up the Xtreme Xperience Supercar venue which allows anyone to drive vehicles such as Ferrari's, Lamborghini's, and Audi's around the track for a fee. Its first event was February 9 and 10, but the event was prematurely canceled on the 10th due to weather. A make-up event was rescheduled for a Sunday run on October 20, 2013. The ARCA series also made a return to the oval, making it the first racing event held on the oval since the new ownership in 2011. The Memphis 250 was held on October 26 with Brian Campbell being the race winner.

Closing 2022
The track was sold sometime around March 2022, and held its last event on June 17, 2022.

Tracks

Drag strip
The drag strip immediately drew the attention of the NHRA and was awarded a sanction in 1988 as the host site of the Mid-South Nationals. While the NHRA has 140 member tracks, Memphis was one of only 23 to host a national event. It also was the section of the complex used by other events such as the Mid-South SCCA events and the Super Chevy Show. The last NHRA race at Memphis, O’Reilly NHRA Mid-South Nationals, was to be hosted on October 4, 2009, but a rain delay postponed the event to October 5, 2009. In the winner's circle were Jeff Arend (Funny Car), Morgan Lucas (Top Fuel), Jason Line (Pro Stock) and Michael Phillips (Pro Stock Motorcycle).

The strip will host IHRA events with its new owner, including a Nitro Jam event, as their sister track in Palm Beach is also affiliated with IHRA. The American Drag Racing League announced, on March 3, 2011, that they would hold an event during the weekend of May 20, 2011, at MIR. The IHRA Nitro Jam series continues to race at Memphis, and have set up another finale event for 2014.

Paved oval

On September 13, 1998, before a sold-out crowd and a national television audience, the facility hosted its first NASCAR event—the NASCAR Craftsman Truck Series Memphis 200. NASCAR returned every year since with two events—the Truck Series in the summer, and the Nationwide Series in the fall. Ron Hornaday took home his second consecutive Elvis trophy in the last MemphisTravel.com 200 Camping World Truck Series race held at the oval. A late caution forced a green-white-checkered finish which gave Hornaday the edge on the restart to beat Brian Scott. On October 24, 2009, Brad Keselowski won the race at the oval by holding off Kyle Busch to the finish line on the 11th and final annual racing event, for both the Nationwide Series and the oval, as the track would not carry any racing events in 2010, when Dover Motorsports, Inc. announced the closure of Memphis Motorsports Park, a week after that race.

Records

*Top Fuel and Funny Car based on  records under current NHRA regulations. Pro Stock and Pro Stock Motorcycle are still .

Series hosted

Current
IHRA 2011–present
 NASA 2011–present

Former
ARCA Menards Series 2017–2020
Camping World Truck Series, MemphisTravel.com 200, 1998–2009
Nationwide Series, Kroger On Track for the Cure 250, 1999–2009
NHRA Full Throttle Drag Racing Series 1988–2009
ASA Late Model Series ?–2009
AMA Dragbike ?–2009

See also
List of NASCAR race tracks

References

External links 
Memphis International Raceway Site 
Trackpedia guide to driving this track

NASCAR tracks
ARCA Menards Series tracks
Sports venues in Memphis, Tennessee
Motorsport venues in Tennessee
Buildings and structures in Shelby County, Tennessee
Tourist attractions in Shelby County, Tennessee
NASCAR races at Memphis International Raceway